"Some Kind-a Earthquake" is a song written by Duane Eddy and Lee Hazlewood and performed by Eddy. The song reached #12 on the UK Singles Chart and #37 on the Billboard Hot 100 in 1959. The song appeared on his 1960 album, $1,000,000.00 Worth of Twang.

The single's B-side, "First Love, First Tears", reached #59 on the Billboard Hot 100.

The song was produced by Lee Hazlewood and Lester Sill.

At 1:17, it is the shortest song to have ever hit the Billboard Top 40, or indeed the Top 75.

References

1959 songs
1959 singles
Songs written by Duane Eddy
Songs written by Lee Hazlewood
Duane Eddy songs
Song recordings produced by Lee Hazlewood
Song recordings produced by Lester Sill
Jamie Records singles